Timothy Carlton Congdon Cumberbatch (born 4 October 1939) is an English actor.

Early years
Carlton was born in Oxford, Oxfordshire, England, the son of Pauline Ellen Laing (née Congdon), who died on 11 October 2007, and Henry Carlton Cumberbatch, a decorated naval officer of both World Wars and a prominent figure of London high society. His grandfather, Henry Arnold Cumberbatch CMG, was the Consul General of Queen Victoria in Turkey.

Career
He has had a long and distinguished career in both the theatre (Her Royal Highness..? etc.) and in television, appearing in numerous BBC television series over the years since 1966 to the present day, including Cold Comfort Farm (1968), the sitcoms Executive Stress, Keeping Up Appearances, Next of Kin and in the television films Gauguin the Savage (1980) and  The Scarlet Pimpernel (1982). In 2015 he played Donald Sidwell in “Napoleon’s Violin”, S1:E8 of The Coroner.  His film career has included roles in Baby Love (1969), The Breaking of Bumbo (1970), That Lucky Touch (1975), The Bitch (1979), High Road to China (1983) and Parting Shots (1999). He is currently with the theatrical agency Susan Angel and Kevin Francis Ltd. in London.

Personal life
Carlton is married to actress Wanda Ventham, whom he met in 1970 while filming sequences for the drama series A Family At War  and they have been married since April 1976. They appeared together in Series 2 of BBC drama The Lotus Eaters in 1973 and Series 3 and 4 of BBC series Sherlock in 2014 as the parents of the title character, played by their son, actor Benedict Cumberbatch.

References

External links

1939 births
Living people
20th-century English male actors
21st-century English male actors
Cumberbatch family
English male film actors
English male stage actors
English male television actors
Male actors from Berkshire
Male actors from Oxfordshire
actors from Reading, Berkshire